The Napier Rapier was a British 16-cylinder H pattern air-cooled aero engine designed by Frank Halford and built by Napier & Son shortly before World War II.

Design and development
The Rapier was the first of Napier's H cylinder engines. The rationale for the H is fairly straightforward, in that rather than having an engine with fewer large cylinders, more small cylinders could simply be added. It was believed that an H pattern engine would provide substantially more power and higher RPM's for the same frontal area as a large liquid-cooled V engine. The maximum RPM in a dive was 4,800.

The H-block has a compact layout, as it essentially consists of two vertically opposed inline engines lying one beside another driving side by side crankshafts.  Another advantage is that since the cylinders are opposed, the motion in one is balanced by the opposite motion in the one on the opposite side, leading to very smooth running.  The Rapier suffered many of the same problems as the later Dagger and Sabre engines.  The Fairey Seafox and Short S.20 were both powered by the Napier Rapier.

Applications
List from Lumsden. 
Airspeed AS.5C Courier (1 built, later re-engined)
Blackburn H.S.T.10 (1 built)
Bristol Bulldog TM (1 used as testbed)
de Havilland DH.77 (1 built)
Fairey Seafox (66 built)
Saro Cloud A.19/1 (1 built as engine test-bed)
Short S.20 Mercury (1 built)

Engines on display
A preserved Rapier engine is on static display at the Shuttleworth Collection, Bedfordshire, England.

Specifications (Rapier V)

See also

References

Notes

Bibliography
Gunston, Bill. World Encyclopedia of Aero Engines: From the Pioneers to the Present Day. 5th edition, Stroud, UK: Sutton, 2006.
 Lumsden, Alec. British Piston Engines and Their Aircraft. Marlborough, UK: Airlife Publishing, 2003. .
 Ogilvy, David. Shuttleworth - The Historic Aeroplanes. Shrewsbury, UK: Airlife Publishing, 1989 
White, Graham. Allied Aircraft Piston Engines of World War II: History and Development of Frontline Aircraft Piston Engines Produced by Great Britain and the United States During World War II. Warrendale, Pennsylvania: SAE International, 1995.

External links

British aero-engine data table - Oldengine.org

Rapier
Boxer engines
1920s aircraft piston engines
H engines